Sigma Phi Beta may refer to:

Sigma Phi Beta (fraternity), a college fraternity for gay, straight, bisexual, and transgender men.
Sigma Phi Beta (sorority), a defunct sorority belonging to the National Panhellenic Conference.